Nerita aterrima is a species of sea snail, a marine gastropod mollusk in the family Neritidae.

Description
The shell grows to a length of 27 mm

Distribution
This species occurs in the Pacific Ocean off the Philippines and Western Australia.

References

 Steyn, D.G. & Lussi, M. (1998) Marine Shells of South Africa. An Illustrated Collector's Guide to Beached Shells. Ekogilde Publishers, Hartebeespoort, South Africa, ii + 264 pp.

External links
 Vermes. In: Gmelin J.F. (Ed.) Caroli a Linnaei Systema Naturae per Regna Tria Naturae, Ed. 13. Tome 1(6). G.E. Beer, Lipsiae
 Reeve, L. A. (1855). Monograph of the genus Nerita. In: Conchologia Iconica, or, illustrations of the shells of molluscous animals, vol. 9, pls 1-19, and unpaginated text. L. Reeve & Co., London
 Récluz, C. A. (1842). Observations sur la Neritina (Neripteron) gigas, Lesson. Revue zoologique, par la Société Cuvierienne. 5: 234-236
 Quoy J.R.C. & Gaimard J.P. (1832-1835). Voyage de découvertes de l'"Astrolabe" exécuté par ordre du Roi, pendant les années 1826-1829, sous le commandement de M. J. Dumont d'Urville. Zoologie
 Récluz, C. A. (1841). Description de quelques nouvelles espèces de Nérites vivantes. Revue Zoologique, par la Société Cuvierienne. 1841(4): 102-109; 1841(5): 147-152; 1841(9): 273-278; 1841(10): 310-318; 1841(11): 337-343
 Récluz, C. A. (1850). Notice sur le genre Nerita et sur le s.-g. Neritina, avec le catalogue synonymique des Néritines. Journal de Conchyliologie. 1: 131-164, 277-288, pls 7, 11

Neritidae
Gastropods described in 1791